Ortezzano is a comune (municipality) in the Province of Fermo in the Italian region Marche, located about  south of Ancona and about  north of Ascoli Piceno.

Ortezzano borders the following municipalities: Carassai, Montalto delle Marche, Monte Rinaldo, Monte Vidon Combatte, Montottone.

Demographic evolution

References

Cities and towns in the Marche